Joanne Roney  (born 13 September 1961) is the current Chief executive for Manchester City Council.

Early life
Roney was born in September 1961 and grew up on a council estate in Shard End, Birmingham.

Career
Roney was an apprentice at 16 with Birmingham City Council's housing department. She later went on to become Director of Housing for Kirklees Metropolitan Borough Council, West Yorkshire. She then worked for 10 years as Sheffield City Council's Executive Director of housing and community care where she was involved in the regeneration of Park Hill estate by Urban Splash. While working her way through the ranks she studied part-time at Birmingham University and gained an MBA in public sector management.

Roney became Chief executive for Wakefield Metropolitan District Council in July 2008. 

In 2009, the Anglo Irish Bank, which was funding half of the £200 million need for Trinity Walk shopping centre, Wakefield, collapsed and the developer, Modus, went into administration. 

Roney devised a rescue package of new finance and in 2010, the scheme was sold to a consortium (Sovereign Land, AREA Property Partners, and Shepherd Construction). She helped the council to create its own housing company, Bridge Homes, in joint partnership with WDH construction in 2014. Roney also oversaw the construction and opening of the Hepworth Wakefield Gallery. 

Roney took up her position as chief executive of Manchester City Council in April 2017.

Personal life
Roney has three brothers and two sisters. Her parents are deceased. She is a fan of Birmingham City F.C. and Star Wars. She also owns a rescue cat, Tiger.

Awards
 2009 : OBE for services to local government.

References

External links
 Twitter

1961 births
Alumni of the University of Birmingham
British chief executives
Living people
Local government in Wakefield
Manchester City Council
Officers of the Order of the British Empire
People from Birmingham, West Midlands
Local government officers in England